The Price of Murder is the tenth historical mystery novel about Sir John Fielding by Bruce Alexander (a pseudonym for Bruce Cook).

Plot summary
Sir John and Jeremy are drawn deep into the notorious Seven Dials area of London, where they must contend with the most sordid inclinations of both the working class and the aristocracy. When the body of a young girl is pulled from the Thames, the search for the girl's mother takes Jeremy to the races.

See also
A subplot is based on the notorious case of Elizabeth Canning.

2003 American novels
Sir John Fielding series

Novels set in London
G. P. Putnam's Sons books